Yakup II of Germiyan (death 1429)  also known as Yakup Çelebi, was the ruler of Germiyanids an  Anatolian beylik between 1388 and 1429. (Anatolia is the Asiatic part of Turkey)

Background 
 

Germiyan Beylik, centered in Kütahya, was an important principality formed in Anatolia after the disintegration of Seljuks of Turkey. Initially it controlled most of West Anatolia. But after local governors of Germiyan formed their own beyliks (like Aydın and Saruhan) Germiyan power was declined. Germiyan beys accepted the suzerainty of the Ottoman Beylik in order to check the attacks of the Karaman beylik, another beylik to the southeast of Germiyan.

First reign 

His father was Süleyman of Germiyan. Following his father's death, Yakup was enthroned as the 4th bey of the Germiyan beylik in 1388. The next year however, after learning the death of Ottoman sultan Murat I in the battle of Kosova, Yakup captured some of the former possession of the beylik, given to Ottomans as a marriage portion. However Beyazıt I the new sultan  and Yakup's brother in law quickly returned to Anatolia and jailed Yakup in the castle of İpsala, a castle in the European part of the Ottoman Empire.

Years in prison
Yakup spent about 10 years in İpsala castle. In 1399 he escaped  to Damascus in Syria, where he met Timur. In the battle of Ankara in 1402, Yakup fought on the side of Timur. The Ottomans were defeated and Timur gave him the former possessions of the beylik.

Second reign
Yakup's second reign coincides with the Ottoman Interregnum, and beginning by 1410, Yakup allied himself with Mehmet Çelebi (future Mehmet I) . At the end of the interregnum in 1413, he restored the suzerainty of the Ottomans. Except for a brief duration following the death of Mehmet I, Ottoman suzerainty continued to the end of Yakup's reign. Yakup had no son, and in 1427 Yakup visited Edirne, the Ottoman capital, to bequeathe the beylik to the Ottoman Empire. The next year he died and Germiyan beylik ceased to exist

References 

Turkic rulers
1429 deaths
Year of birth unknown
People from Kütahya
History of Kütahya Province
Germiyan
14th-century monarchs in Asia
15th-century monarchs in Asia